Mexican Studies/Estudios Mexicanos is a bilingual, peer reviewed academic journal covering Mexican studies. Articles in both English and Spanish focus on the history, politics, economy, scientific development, and the literature and  arts of Mexico. The journal is published three times a year by University of California Press on behalf of the University of California Institute for Mexico and the United States (UCMEXUS), and the Universidad Nacional Autónoma de México. The current editor-in-chief is Ruth Hellier-Tinoco,  who succeeded founding editor, Jaime Rodríguez O. The journal's editorial offices are located at University of California, Santa Barbara.

External links
 

University of California Press academic journals
Latin American studies journals
Multilingual journals
English-language journals
French-language journals
Works about Mexico
Area studies journals
Latin American studies
Works about Latin America
History of the Americas journals
History journals
Publications established in 1985
Triannual journals